Fascinator is the eighth studio album by Czech black metal band Master's Hammer. It was released on 10 February 2018 through their own label, Jihosound Records, and is available in vinyl, CD and cassette formats.

It is their first release since Vracejte konve na místo. to count with the participation of guitarist Petr "Blackie" Hošek (a former member of another important Czech black metal band, Root) as an official member, their first one since Mantras with former timpani player Honza "Silenthell" Přibyl, and the first one overall with new bassist Petr "Rámus" Mecák.

Two tracks of the album, "Ve věži ticha" and "Estetika ďábla", were uploaded to vocalist Franta Štorm's official YouTube channel as teasers on 11 September and 22 November 2017, respectively.

Štorm claims on the album's liner notes that most of its writing process were inspired by trips he took to Goa, India (a common destination for him), and Norway (Master's Hammer performed at a festival in Bergen in 2017). "Linkola" is a tribute to the Finnish philosopher Pentti Linkola.

Track 11's title is in Portuguese.

Critical reception
The album was positively reviewed upon its release. MetalReviews.com, giving it a grade of 85/100, praised its "eerie atmosphere", calling it a "weird and theatrical" album and comparing it favorably to the sonority of Japanese band Sigh. Metal Invader rated it with a 4.5 out of 6, comparing Master's Hammer to American band Psychotic Waltz and saying the album was a huge improvement over the "rather mediocre" Formulæ. Decibel Magazine noticed its "more atmospheric sound", praising its "great riffs and a punishing rhythm section".

Track listing

 Tracks 12 and 13 were not included on the vinyl issue of the album.

Personnel
 František "Franta" Štorm – vocals, electric guitar, keyboards, production, cover art
 Petr "Blackie" Hošek – froggish solos, rhythm guitar
 Jan "Honza" Kapák – drums, guitar harmonies
 Honza "Silenthell" Přibyl – timpani
 Petr "Rámus" Mecák – bass guitar
 Tomáš "Necrocock" Kohout – sickly vocals, harmonies
 Tom Rentor – shout (track 4)
 Ondřej Pospíšil – mastering

References

2018 albums
Master's Hammer albums